Sølyst is an island in Stavanger municipality in Rogaland county, Norway.  The  island is located in the Buøy neighborhood in the borough of Hundvåg, just north of the centre of the city of Stavanger. It is connected to mainland Stavanger via the island Grasholmen and the Stavanger City Bridge.  The island is hilly and rocky as well as heavily-treed.  Most development is located on the south shore.

See also
List of islands of Norway

References

Islands of Stavanger